Louis J. F. Filloux (1869–1957) was a French artillery officer. He designed several artillery pieces used in World War I, including the Canon de 155mm GPF, the Canon de 194 mle GPF, and the 370mm Filloux mortar. His highest rank was lieutenant colonel.

Filloux was made a Commander of the Legion of Honour by France and received the Distinguished Service Medal from the United States.

Gallery

References

External links
  Colonel Filloux biography at Village of Pontlevoy site
 "Le mortier de 370, premier chef d'œuvre du chef d'escadron Filloux", Blindés & Matériel #95, January 2011.

1869 births
1957 deaths
French military engineers
French military personnel of World War I
Commandeurs of the Légion d'honneur